Louiza Patikas (born 1976 or 1977) is a British actress, known for her roles as Helen Titchener in the BBC Radio 4 soap opera The Archers and Moira Pollock on the ITV soap opera Coronation Street.

Career
Patikas has played Helen on The Archers since 2000. Helen was the central role in a high-profile storyline about domestic abuse and coercive control. Patikas discussed the storyline on BBC Radio 4's Woman's Hour in March 2016. In December 2016 Patikas selected and presented her round-up of the year's radio highlights for BBC Radio 4's Pick of the Year.

In June 2017 it was announced Patikas would be joining the cast of the long-running ITV soap opera Coronation Street as medical-centre practice manager Moira Pollock. She left the show in November 2017. In February 2018, Patikas reprised her role as Moira.

Personal life

In 2007 Patikas married the actor Jonathan Aris. They met on the set of the 2005 television film Planespotting.

When not acting Patikas works as a journalist and fashion stylist.

References

External links 
 
 Louiza Patikas entry in the British Film Institute database

1970s births
Living people
British actresses
British radio actresses
British soap opera actresses
Place of birth missing (living people)
British television actresses
British women journalists
The Archers
British people of Greek Cypriot descent